East Shreve Run is a  long tributary to Lake Canadohta (Oil Creek) in Crawford County, Pennsylvania.  The watershed is about 43% forested and 50% agricultural.  The rest is of other uses.

Course
East Shreve Run rises on the South Branch French Creek divide in Union Township, Pennsylvania.  East Shreve Run then flows south through the Erie Drift Plain to Oil Creek at Lake Canadohta, Pennsylvania.

Watershed
East Shreve Run drains  of area, receives about 46.4 in/year of precipitation, has a topographic wetness index of 483.63 and is about 45% forested.

References

Additional Images

Rivers of Pennsylvania
Rivers of Crawford County, Pennsylvania
Rivers of Erie County, Pennsylvania